Burnup's hunter slug (Chlamydephorus burnupi)  is a species of land slug in the family Chlamydephoridae. It is endemic to South Africa, where it lives in forested foothill habitat.

References

Endemic fauna of South Africa
Chlamydephoridae
Gastropods of Africa
Vulnerable animals
Vulnerable biota of Africa
Gastropods described in 1892
Taxonomy articles created by Polbot